Syndicate of Professional Artists in Lebanon was established on 28 June 1993 and includes persons who hold the following professions:
 Acting
 Music : Songwriters, Composers, Instrumentalists and Singers.
 Film directing: Theatrical, Film, TV and broadcasting
 Writing: Playwright, Cinema, TV, broadcasting and Song poets
 Dancing : Classical ballet, Contemporary dance, Ballroom, Latin and Partner dance.
 Cinematography: Decorative arts, Illumination, Theatre Fashion design
 Theater, film, radio and television technicians: Director of photography, Engineer, Sound, Photographer, Writer, Director of Technical Production, Assistant director.

References 

1993 establishments in Lebanon

Arts in Lebanon
Arts organisations based in Lebanon